Alexandria National Cemetery is a United States National Cemetery located in the city of Pineville, in Rapides Parish, Louisiana.

History 
In 1867, an  plot was appropriated from a local resident to establish the Alexandria National Cemetery. It was originally intended as a place to bury Union soldiers who died in the area during the Civil War, but later, remains from Mount Pleasant, Cheneyville, Yellow Bayou, and Fort Brown, Texas, were re-interred in Alexandria. Of approximately 1378 Civil War burials, 507 are known and 871 are unknown.

Alexandria National Cemetery was placed on the National Register of Historic Places in 1997.

Notable burials 
 Sputnik Monroe (1928–2006), professional wrestler
 US Representative Gillis William Long (1923–1985)
 Major Jacob Brown (1778–1846), for whom Fort Brown, Texas is named
 John J. Williams (American Civil War) (1843–1865), the last soldier killed in the American Civil War
 Civil War Union Army Captain Ira W. Claflin (1834–1867)
 There are fifty-seven Buffalo Soldiers interred at the Alexandria National Cemetery
 There are 5 German P.O.W.’s buried at The Alexandria National Cemetery

New interments 
The cemetery is closed to new interments. Exceptions to this include subsequent interments for veterans or eligible family members in an existing gravesite. Cemetery policy allows for first-come, first-served waitlist to eligible veterans if burial space becomes available due to a canceled reservation or when a disinterment has been completed.

See also 
 United States Department of Veterans Affairs

References

External links 

 National Cemetery Administration
 Alexandria National Cemetery in Louisiana
 
 
 
 
 

Cemeteries on the National Register of Historic Places in Louisiana
United States national cemeteries
Pineville, Louisiana
Protected areas of Rapides Parish, Louisiana
Historic American Landscapes Survey in Louisiana
National Register of Historic Places in Rapides Parish, Louisiana